Sunbus Sunshine Coast was an Australian operator of bus services on the Sunshine Coast, Queensland. It operates 25 services under contract to the Government of Queensland under the TransLink banner.It is one of Sunbus' operations. As of 2022 Sunbus has changed its name as part of a business re-brand by the parent company, Kinetic. Sunbus has now been dissolved into the Kinetic brand with its fleet of buses reflecting this change.

History
In 1995, Harry Blundred, the proprietor of Thames Transit in the United Kingdom, was awarded the operating rights to route services in the Sunshine Coast region, taking over the services around Caloundra and Maroochydore that had been provided by Sunshine Coast Coaches. In 1996, Tewantin Bus Service was purchased with the services between Maroochydore and Noosa.

As part of the deal, Sunbus was also responsible for the operation of school bus services in the region, however these were sold in 1997 to fellow British bus operator Stagecoach.

In April 2008, Blundred sold Sunbus Sunshine Coast along with the other Sunbus operations to Transit Australia Group.

In April 2019, Transit Australia Group was purchased by AATS Group, parent company of Skybus and majority owned by OPTrust. In August 2019, AATS Group was rebranded the Kinetic Group.

In late 2022, Sunbus was officially branded as KINETIC with all new advertising now showing the Kinetic Brand. All new buses will display the Kinetic logo with the current fleet of Sunbus slowly being updated to reflect the new brand name. The current website for Sunbus will stay active until early 2023 before it will be deactivated, directing customers to the new Kinetic website.

Routes
Sunbus operated 27 services under contract to the Government of Queensland under the TransLink banner.

Fleet
Sunbus introduced a fleet of Mercedes-Benz Vario midibuses and Toyota Coaster minibuses. These have since been replaced by Bustech bodied Volvo B12BLEs and Bustech MDi and XDis.

As of May 2018, the fleet consisted of 91 buses. Sunbus introduced a light blue livery. This has been replaced by the TransLink livery of white body, green ends, a green and blue wavy stripe down each side and the TransLink logo toward the back. However, buses 5701-5728 (excluding 5707), sport the original livery.

Depot
Sunbus operated depots in Caloundra and Marcoola.

References

External links
Translink timetables

Bus companies of Queensland
Kinetic Group companies
Public transport in Sunshine Coast, Queensland
Translink (Queensland)
Transport companies established in 1995
1995 establishments in Australia